Tennessee House Bill 878 is a proposed state law in the U.S. state of Tennessee, granting an individual the right to refuse to solemnize a marriage if the individual has a religious or conscience-based objection to that partnership.

The law would thus allow wedding officiants to legally discriminate against couples entering interracial and same-sex marriages. According to its critics, the bill is vaguely worded in order "to invite a Kim Davis-type lawsuit to go up against Obergefell" and test existing marriage equality case law.

The Senate sponsor, Republican Sen. Mark Pody, stated in 2015 that God had called on him to stop same-sex marriages. Previously, Pody sponsored the Tennessee Natural Marriage Defense Act in 2019, which would have prohibited government officials from facilitating same-sex marriages. The House sponsor, Rep. Monty Fritts stated, "This bill was designed to be simply and clearly to protect the rights of the officiate or officiates of wedding ceremonies."

Public reactions
In reaction to both Tennessee House Bill 878 and Tennessee Senate Bill 3, Sara Warbelow, the legal director of the Human Rights Campaign, stated, “Instead of focusing on the issues that Tennesseans actually care about, radical politicians are wasting their time, and using their power, to target the LGBTQ+ community. These bills are not about protecting children and they are not about religious freedom. They are about stripping away the basic human rights that LGBTQ+ people have fought for over decades.”

See also
 LGBT rights in Tennessee

References

External links
 Tennessee House Bill 878
 House Bill 878: History, details, and related video from the Tennessee legislative sessions

Tennessee General Assembly
LGBT culture in Tennessee
2023 in LGBT history
LGBT law in the United States
Same-sex marriage legislation in the United States